Hola Prystan is a city in Skadovsk Raion, Kherson Oblast, southern Ukraine. It hosts the administration of the Hola Prystan urban hromada, one of the hromadas of Ukraine. It has a population of 

The Konka, a tributary of the Dnieper, flows through the city.

Administrative status 
Until 18 July, 2020, Hola Prystan was incorporated as a city of oblast significance and the center of Hola Prystan Municipality. It also served as the administrative center of Hola Prystan Raion, though it did not belong to the raion. The municipality was abolished in July 2020 as part of the administrative reform of Ukraine, which reduced the number of raions of Kherson Oblast to five. The area of Hola Prystan Municipality was merged into Skadovsk Raion.

History
Hola Prystan literally meaning barren pier, was founded in 1709 by Zaporizhian Cossacks as Holyi Pereviz (Barren Ford). Since 1785, it has been called Hola Prystan.

Jews apparently began to settle in Hola Prystan at the beginning of the 19th century. In 1897 Hola Prystan’s 667 Jews comprised 11 percent of the total population.

At the turn of the century many of the businesses in the town were owned by Jews. In 1905 there was a pogrom in which 2 Jewish shops were destroyed. The pogrom was stopped not by the authorities but by peasants who did not take part in the attack on the Jews.

Under the Soviets the Jewish population of Hola Prystan fell, mainly due to migration to larger cities in search of jobs and education opportunities. In 1939 Hola Prystan‘s 276 Jews comprised 3.6 percent of the total population.

Hola Prystan was occupied by German troops on September 13, 1941. On October 12, 1941 the Jews of Hola Pristan were shot outside the town.

Hola Pristan was liberated by the Red Army on November 4, 1943.

On 1 August 1997 a Project R1415 (NATO code: Flamingo class) Ukrainian patrol boat Hola Prystan was named after the town.

Hola Pristan was granted the status of regional town on May 17, 2013.

The city has been occupied by Russian forces since 2022, with the Russian invasion of Ukraine.

Gallery

References

External links
 The murder of the Jews of Hola Prystan during World War II, at Yad Vashem website.

Cities in Kherson Oblast
Taurida Governorate
Cities of regional significance in Ukraine
Holocaust locations in Ukraine
Populated places on the Dnieper in Ukraine